Yugoslavia competed at the 1988 Summer Paralympics in Seoul, South Korea. 35 competitors from Yugoslavia won 19 medals including 4 gold, 4 silver and 11 bronze and finished 27th in the medal table.

See also 
 Yugoslavia at the Paralympics
 Yugoslavia at the 1988 Summer Olympics

References 

Yugoslavia at the Paralympics
1988 in Yugoslav sport
Nations at the 1988 Summer Paralympics